The 1925 Rock Island Independents season was their sixth and final season in the league. The team failed to improve on their previous league record of 5–2–2, losing three NFL games. They finished eighth in the league.

Schedule

 Game in italics was against a non-NFL team.

Standings

References

Rock Island Independents seasons
Rock Island Independents
Rock Island